Myloplus planquettei is a medium to large omnivorous fish of the family Serrasalmidae from South America, where found in the Mana, the Maroni and the Essequibo Basins on the Guiana Shield.

Etymology
The fish is named in honor of Paul Planquette (1940-1996), of the Institut National de la Recherche Agronomique in Kourou, French Guiana thanks to his work studying the fishes of French Guiana.

References

Serrasalmidae
Taxa named by Michel Louis Arthur Marie Ange François Jégu
Taxa named by Philippe Keith
Taxa named by Pierre-Yves Le Bail
Fish described in 2003